Osceola is the name of a nineteenth-century Seminole leader in the United States of America.

Osceola may also refer to

People
 Pen name used by the Danish author Karen Blixen (1885–1962)

Places
In Canada:
 Osceola, Ontario, a community in Admaston Bromley, Ontario

In the United States:
Osceola, Arkansas
Osceola, Indiana
Osceola, Iowa
Osceola, Missouri
Osceola, Nebraska
Osceola, Nevada
Osceola, New York
Osceola, South Dakota
Osceola, West Virginia
Osceola, Wisconsin, a village in Polk County
Osceola, Fond du Lac County, Wisconsin, a town
Osceola, Grant County, Wisconsin, a projected town which never materialized in what would become Potosi
Osceola, Polk County, Wisconsin, a town
Mount Osceola, White Mountains, New Hampshire

Waterbodies
 Lake Osceola, Winter Park, Florida
 Lake Osceola (Coral Gables) on the University of Miami campus

Other uses 
 Osceola and Renegade, symbols of Florida State University
 Osceola National Forest, a national forest in Florida
 Osceola and St Croix Valley Railway, a heritage railroad in Osceola, Wisconsin
 Osceola, a subspecies of wild turkey
 USS Osceola, the name of several United States Navy ships
 Tom and John Osceola, characters in Key Largo (film)
 Osceola, a synonym of the moth genus Peoria (moth)

See also
 Osceola County (disambiguation)
 Osceola Mills, Pennsylvania
 Osceola Township (disambiguation)
 Oceola (disambiguation)